Robert Frederick Wiles (20 November 1914 – June 1983) known as Freddie Wiles, was a British actor best known for playing Goddard in Are You Being Served. However he was only credited for this part Season 5, Episode 7. He also appeared in one episode as Mr Clampton, the porter.

Freddie Wiles was born Robert Frederick Wiles on 20 November 1914 in London, England.

He also appeared in other shows such as Dad's Army, Doctor in Charge, Doomwatch, The Benny Hill Show and Oh Brother!.

Wiles died in June 1983 at the age of 68 in Rotherham, South Yorkshire, England.

References 

1914 births
1983 deaths
British male television actors
20th-century British male actors